No Picnic is a film written and directed by Philip Hartman. It was filmed in black and white at New York in 1985 and was released the next year, in the Sundance Film Festival, where it won Excellence in Cinematography Award: Dramatic. Described as "a cinematic love letter to a pre-gentrified New York", the film captures the East Village of the 1980s. Providing the soundtrack are such performers as "The Raunch Hands", Lenny Kaye, Charles Mingus, Fela Kuti, Richard Hell and "Student Teachers". It stars Richard Hell, Judith Malina, Luis Guzmán and Steve Buscemi.

Plot 
Failed musician Macabee Cohen (David Brisbin) makes his living servicing jukeboxes in the neighborhood, while in the search for the woman of his dreams. The obvious gentrification around is distressing and highlights his ill-fated life. His frustration increases when faced with individuals who remind him of his former aspirations.

Cast 
 David Brisbin - Mac
 Clare Bauman - The Fan
 Ryan Cutrona - Live Pimp
 Anne D'Agnillo - Anne
 Luis Guzmán - Arroyo
 Richard Hell - Irate Tenant
 Steve Buscemi - Dead Pimp
 David Murray Jaffe - Big Pig Manager

References

External links 

1986 films
Films set in Manhattan
American drama films
American black-and-white films
American independent films
1986 drama films
1986 independent films
1980s English-language films
1980s American films